Bruce Laurence Webster  (13 August 1927 – 25 July 2019) was an Australian broadcaster and  politician. He worked for the Australian Broadcasting Commission (ABC) from 1947, joining as a messenger boy, then becoming an announcer and newsreader. He was the member for Pittwater, in the New South Wales Legislative Assembly from 8 February 1975 until 21 July 1978.

Media career
Bruce Webster worked in various roles in radio and television news, presentation and reporting at the ABC until the 1960s. Bruce joined Qantas in 1966 as PR Manager in San Francisco before moving back to Sydney in 1969 to join commercial media, co-hosting The Today Show on Channel 7 with Patricia Lovell.

State politics
In the mid 1970s, Webster left the media to run for New South Wales state politics as a member of the Liberal Party. He succeeded Robert Askin in the seat of Pittwater in the 1975 election and was the party's spokesman on Mines and Energy.

Return to media
Disillusioned with politics he left the parliament after about 4 years and joined Radio station 2UE as News Director before rejoining the ABC, moving to Canberra to present news and sport on 2CN 666 and to host the live radio broadcasts of Parliament on what is now ABC News Radio.

Honours
Honours bestowed on Webster in his career included: the Order of Australia (OAM) Medal, the Queen's Jubilee Medal and the Centenary Medal.

Personal life
Webster was the son of Sidney and Helena Webster. In 1952 he married his wife Pat, and they had three children.

He died, aged 91, in Gosford, New South Wales on 25 July 2019.

References

1927 births
2019 deaths 
Liberal Party of Australia members of the Parliament of New South Wales
Members of the New South Wales Legislative Assembly
Recipients of the Medal of the Order of Australia
ABC News (Australia) presenters
People educated at Wesley College (Victoria)
People from Brighton, Victoria
Qantas people
Australian expatriates in the United States
Television personalities from Melbourne
Radio personalities from Melbourne
Politicians from Sydney
Recipients of the Centenary Medal